Bridge of Four Lions is a 28-metre-long pedestrian bridge over the Griboedov Canal in St Petersburg, connecting L'vinyi Drive to Malaya Podyacheskaya Street. The Lion Bridge is in the Admiralteysky District of St. Petersburg, connecting the Kazansky and Spassky Islands. Its abutments are crowned with four cast iron sculptures of lions, which give the bridge its name. The structure, suspended by cables emerging from the mouths of lions, was constructed in 1825 according to the design of two well-established bridge builders, Tratter and Kristianovich. It is an outstanding monument of bridge-building architecture of the first quarter of the 19th century [5]. It is also one of the three surviving pedestrian chain bridges in St. Petersburg (along with Bank and Pochtamtsky bridges).

Location

It connects Lviny Lane and Malaya Podyacheskaya Street. Upstream is the Podyachsky Bridge, below the Kharlamov Bridge. The nearest metro stations (1 km) are Sadovaya, Sennaya Ploshchad, and Spasskaya.

Name

The Lion Bridge got its name from four cast iron sculptures of lions by the sculptor PP Sokolov, located at the corners of the bridge [6]. Until 1912, the bridge was also called Mariinsky (after the former name of Lion Lane) and Teatralny pedestrian (along Teatralnaya square located nearby).

History

The need to build a bridge was caused by the growth of population in the area adjacent to the Catherine Canal [9]. The bridge project was developed by the engineers Tratter and Kristianovich [10]. Simultaneously with Lvin, a project was drawn up for the second chain pedestrian bridge across the canal - Bankovsky. On February 18, 1825, both projects were approved, and the construction of the bridge began in the summer of the same year [3]. It was supposed to be completed by October of the same year, but due to a delay in the manufacture of metal parts of the bridge, assembly of the bridge began in the spring of 1826. For the construction of the bridge supports, the embankment backbone was dismantled (without dismantling the granite facing) [4]. The manufacture of cast iron and metal parts, as well as the assembly of elements at the construction site, was carried out by the Byrd plant [3]. On July 1, 1826, the bridge was opened for traffic [4].

The sculptures of lions were made by academician P.P.Sokolov. Work on the creation of the models lasted from May to September 1825, and the sculptor also made alabaster molds [5]. The sculpture was supposed to be minted from copper sheets, but then the figures were cast from cast iron at the Alexandrovsky iron foundry [5] [11]. The sculptures of lions were painted in matt white marbled paint.

In 1882, all the wooden parts of the bridge were replaced, the cast iron railings were replaced with iron forged ones of a very primitive design, the lanterns located in the middle of the bridge were dismantled [12] [2]. The right-bank embankment of the canal was raised by one row of granite stones, while the figures of lions with pedestals and chains were raised [13].

In 1948, by engineer A. M. Yanovskiy, a major reconstruction of the bridge was carried out including the replacement of wooden longitudinal beams with metal I-beams [11]. In 1954, a new handrail and lanterns were installed on the bridge, made according to the original project, the white color of the lion sculptures was restored (after a series of unsuccessful dark paints) [5]. Restoration work on the reconstruction of the bridge rails, floor lamps with lanterns and the restoration of the original painting were carried out by the Special Scientific Restoration Production Workshops of the Office of Architecture, designed by the architect A. L. Rotach and the technician G. F. Perlina [14] [15].

In 1999-2000, according to the project of JSC Institute "Stroyproekt," the bridge was overhauled: the beams of the superstructure were replaced, the sculptures of lions were restored [16]. In 2018, work was carried out for the restoration of the lion sculptures[17] [18].

Copy of the bridge

In 1838, a reduced copy of the bridge (length 17.3 m, width 2 m) was erected by the firm Borsig for the project of the German architect LF Hesse on territory of Berlin's Great Tiergarten park.

The Lion Bridge was the first Berlin suspension bridge. Unlike the original in St. Petersburg, the superstructure and railings of the Berlin Lion Bridge are still wooden.

Design

The bridge is a single-span beam, the chains play a decorative role [1]. The superstructure consists of two welded double-tee beams made of low-alloy steel, combined with a chain hanging system with a distribution strip [16].

The function of the pylons is performed by the sculptured cast iron frames (frames), attached with anchor bolts through the masonry to a wooden grille, compressed from above and below by massive cast iron slabs, to which supporting chains are attached [19] [10]. A monolithic reinforced concrete slab was built under the pylons within the boundaries of the cast iron pedestals of the sculptures [16]. The chains are made up of round metal links.

At the entrances to the bridge, sculptures of lions are installed on cast iron pedestals. The railing is of artistic casting, and the design is a grid of a continuous rows of crossed rectangular rods, the ends of which at the top and bottom are connected by semicircular arcs of the same cross-section in the form of stylized eights, forming places for semicircular bronze rosettes [11]. A similar perimeter design was used for several St. Petersburg bridges (for example, the Ioannovsky bridge). In the middle of the bridge, two multifaceted lanterns on cast iron posts rich in molding are mounted in the railings. Some parts of the bridge (balls and rosettes of the fence, shaped parts of lanterns, etc.) are gilded.

The width of the bridge between the railings is 2.28 m, the length of the bridge is 22.44 (27.8) m, the distance between the axes of the chains is 2.42 m [20] [3] [2]. The surface for the walkway of the bridge is wood.

Gallery

References

Footnotes

1. Bogdanov, G. I., Yarokhno V.I. The Neva was dressed in granite, bridges hung over the waters ...: to the 200th anniversary of the St. Petersburg State University of Railways, 1809-2009, and the 125th anniversary of the "Bridges" department of PGUPS. - SPb .: Goland, 2009 .-- S. 156 .-- 174 p.
2. Stepnov, 1991, p. 308.

3. Bridges of Leningrad, 1986, p. 194.

4. Kochedamov, 1959, p. 219.

5. Kochedamov, 1959, p. 220.

6. Why are they named so?, 1996, p. 330.

7. Yerofeyev А. D., Vladimirovich А. G. Petersburg in street names. The origin of the names of streets and avenues, rivers and canals, bridges and islands. — SPb .: AST, 2009 .-- 752 p.

8. City names today and yesterday: Petersburg toponymy / comp. S. V. Alekseeva, A. G. Vladimirovich, A. D. Erofeev et al. - 2nd ed., Revised. and add. - SPb .: Lik, 1997 .-- S. 70 .-- 288 p. - (Three centuries of Northern Palmyra). - .

9. Kochedamov, 1959, p. 217.

10. RGIA. F. 1487. Op. 4.D. 273

11. Bridges of Leningrad, 1986, p. 196.

12. Petrov A.N. Architectural monuments of Leningrad. - L .: Stroyizdat, Leningrad. department, 1972 .-- p. 439 .-- 498 p.

13. Report of the St. Petersburg City Council for 1882. - SPb., 1883. - p. 306-307, 311.

14. Bridges of Leningrad, 1986, p. 197.

15. On the approval of the protective obligation of the Owner or other legal owner of the object of cultural heritage of federal significance "The Lion's Bridge", included in the unified state register of cultural heritage monuments of the peoples of the Russian Federation. Committee for State Control, Use and Protection of Historical and Cultural Monuments (October 10, 2017). Date of treatment October 19, 2019.

16. Lion Bridge over the Griboyedov Canal // AO "Institute" Stroyproekt "

17. Completed work on the restoration of 4 sculptures of lions on the Lion Bridge across the Griboyedov Canal // OOO "RM" Heritage "

18. Implementation of a set of measures for the restoration of museum items: 4 sculptures of lions (inv. No. 43 / 1-4) located on the Lion Bridge across the Griboyedov Canal in St. Petersburg // Unified information system in the field of procurement.

19. Bridges of Leningrad, 1986, p. 195.

20. Bridges and embankments of Leningrad, 1963, p. 104.

Literature

 Gorbachevich, K.S, Khablo EP Why are they named so? About the origin of the names of streets, squares, islands, rivers and bridges in St. Petersburg. - 4th ed., Rev. - SPb .: Norint, 1996 .-- S. 330 .-- 359 p. - .

 Bunin M. S. Bridges of Leningrad. Essays on the history and architecture of the bridges of St. Petersburg - Petrograd - Leningrad. - L .: Stroyizdat, 1986 .-- 280 p.

 Gorbachevich, K.S, Khablo EP Why are they named so? About the origin of the names of streets, squares, islands, rivers and bridges in Leningrad. - 3rd ed., Rev. and add. - L .: Lenizdat, 1985 .-- P. 468 .-- 511 p.

 Novikov, Yu.V. Bridges and embankments of Leningrad / Comp. P.P. Stepnov. - L .: Lenizdat, 1991 .-- 320 p.

 Punin, A. L. The Story of the Leningrad Bridges. - L .: Lenizdat, 1971. - 192 p.

 Tumilovich, E. V., Altunin S. E. Bridges and embankments of Leningrad. Album. - M .: Publishing house of the Ministry of Communal Services of the RSFSR, 1963. - 298 p.

 Kochedamov, V.I. Chain bridges in St. Petersburg in the first quarter of the 19th century // Architectural heritage. - L., 1959. - No. 9. - P. 209-220.

 Troynitsky, S.N. About chain bridges of Petersburg // Old years. - 1907. - March. - p. 96-99

External links

 Львиный мост //СПб ГБУ «Мостотрест»
 Львиный мост //Энциклопедия Санкт-Петербурга

Pedestrian bridges in Russia
Suspension bridges in Russia
Bridges in Saint Petersburg
Bridges completed in 1826
Sculptures of lions
1826 establishments in the Russian Empire
Cultural heritage monuments of federal significance in Saint Petersburg